The Tour de Boussine is a mountain of the Swiss Pennine Alps, overlooking the lake of Mauvoisin in the canton of Valais. It lies east of the Grand Combin.

References

External links
 Tour de Boussine on Hikr

Mountains of the Alps
Alpine three-thousanders
Mountains of Switzerland
Mountains of Valais
Three-thousanders of Switzerland